Melvyn Bernard Nathanson (born October 10, 1944, in Philadelphia, Pennsylvania) is an American mathematician, specializing in number theory, and a Professor of Mathematics at Lehman College and The Graduate Center (City University of New York). His principal work is in additive and combinatorial number theory. He is the author of over 150 research papers in mathematics, and author or editor of 20 books.

Education 

Nathanson graduated from Central High School in 1961 and from the University of Pennsylvania in 1965 with a BA in philosophy. He was a graduate student in biophysics at Harvard University in 1965–66, then moved to the University of Rochester, where he received a PhD in mathematics in 1972. During the academic year 1969–70 he was a visiting research student in the Department of Pure Mathematics and Mathematical Statistics at the University of Cambridge.

Professional life 

Nathanson was on the faculty of Southern Illinois University, Carbondale from 1971 to 1981.  He was Professor of Mathematics and Dean of the Graduate School of Rutgers-Newark from 1981 to 1986, and Provost and Vice President of Academic Affairs at Lehman College (CUNY) from 1986 to 1991.  He has been Professor of Mathematics at Lehman College and The Graduate Center (CUNY) since 1986.  He held visiting positions at Harvard University in 1977–78, Rockefeller University in 1981–83, Tel Aviv University in Spring, 2001, and Princeton University in Fall, 2008.

In 1974–75 Nathanson was Assistant to André Weil in the School of Mathematics of the Institute for Advanced Study.  Nathanson subsequently spent the academic years 1990–91 and 1999–2000, and the Fall, 2007, term at the Institute. He served as President of the Association of Members of the Institute for Advanced Study (AMIAS) from 1998 to 2012.

In 1972–73 Nathanson became the first American mathematician to receive an IREX fellowship to spend a year in the former USSR, where he worked with I. M. Gel'fand at Moscow State University. In 1977 the National Academy of Sciences selected him to spend another year in Moscow on its exchange agreement with the USSR Academy of Sciences.  An international brouhaha ensued when the Soviet government refused to allow him to re-enter the country. He spent the academic year 1977–78 in the mathematics department at Harvard University, where he also worked in the Program for Science and International Affairs, and contributed to the book Nuclear Nonproliferation: The Spent Fuel Problem.
Nathanson is the author/editor/translator of several books and articles on Soviet art and politics, including Komar/Melamid: Two Soviet Dissident Artists,  and Grigori Freiman, It Seems I am a Jew:  A Samizdat Essay on Anti-Semitism in Soviet Mathematics, both published by Southern Illinois University Press.

Nathanson was a frequent collaborator with Paul Erdős, with whom he wrote 19 papers in number theory. He also organizes the Workshop on Combinatorial and Additive Number Theory, which has been held annually at the Graduate Center, CUNY since 2003.
Nathanson's essays on political and social issues related to science have appeared in The New York Times, The Bulletin of the Atomic Scientists, The Mathematical Intelligencer, Notices of the American Mathematical Society, and other publications.

He was elected to the 2018 class of fellows of the American Mathematical Society.

Personal life 

Nathanson is married to Marjorie Frankel Nathanson, Director of the Hunterdon Art Museum in Clinton, New Jersey.
They have two children:  Alex, a video artist with a residency at the Flux Factory in Queens, and Rebecca, a writer on political and social issues who lives in Brooklyn.

Selected publications

Books

Papers 

Nathanson's recent mathematical work is available on the arXiv. Some of his most significant works include:

See also
New York Number Theory Seminar

References

External links 
 homepage: http://www.theoryofnumbers.com

Number theorists
Additive combinatorialists
20th-century American mathematicians
21st-century American mathematicians
Jewish American scientists
1944 births
Living people
City University of New York faculty
Graduate Center, CUNY faculty
Lehman College faculty
Mathematicians from Philadelphia
Fellows of the American Mathematical Society
People from Millburn, New Jersey
21st-century American Jews